Ralph Kress may mean:

 Red Kress (1907–1962), American baseball player whose real name was Ralph
 Ralph H. Kress (1904–1995), American engineer responsible for off-road construction and mining trucks